The 4th Irish Film & Television Awards took place on 10 February 2007 and was hosted by Ryan Tubridy at the Royal Dublin Society Main Hall, Dublin, honouring Irish film and television released in 2006.

Awards in film

Best Film
 The Wind That Shakes the Barley (Winner)
 Breakfast on Pluto
 The Front Line
 Middletown
 Small Engine Repair

Best International Film
 Little Miss Sunshine (Winner)
 Babel
 Casino Royale
 The Departed
 United 93

Best Director
 Neil Jordan — Breakfast on Pluto (Winner)
 John Boorman — In My Country
 David Gleeson — The Front Line
 Brian Kirk — Middletown

Best Script
 Neil Jordan & Pat McCabe for Breakfast on Pluto (Winner)
 Daragh Carville for Middletown
 David Gleeson for The Front Line
 Niall Heery for Small Engine Repair

Best Cinematography
 Seamus Deasy for The Tiger's Tail (Winner)
 Seamus McGarvey for World Trade Center
 Declan Quinn for Breakfast on Pluto
 Robbie Ryan for Isolation

Best Music
 Stephen McKeon for The Tiger's Tail (Winner)
 Niall Byrne for Small Engine Repair
 Patrick Cassidy for The Front Line
 Glen Hansard for Once

Best Production Design
 Mark Geraghty for Get Rich or Die Tryin' (Winner)
 Tom Conroy for Breakfast on Pluto
 Ashleigh Jeffers for Middletown
 Mark Lowry for Small Engine Repair

Best Costume Design
 Consolata Boyle for The Queen (Winner)
 Joan Bergin for The Prestige
 Eimer Ni Mhaldomhnaigh for Breakfast on Pluto
 Maeve Patterson for The Tiger's Tail

Best Hair & Makeup
 Lorraine Glynn, Lynn Johnson for Breakfast on Pluto (Winner)
 Martina McCarthy, Denise Watson for The Tiger's Tail
 Morna Ferguson, Lorraine Glynn for Middletown

Awards in acting

Best Actor in a Lead Role – Film
 Cillian Murphy for Breakfast on Pluto (Winner)
 Pierce Brosnan for The Matador
 Colin Farrell for Miami Vice
 Brendan Gleeson for Studs
 Cillian Murphy for The Wind That Shakes the Barley

Best Actress in a Lead Role – Film
 Eva Birthistle for Middletown
 Gemma Doorly for A Song For Rebecca
 Pauline McLynn for Gypo
 Ruth Negga for Isolation

Best Actor in a Supporting Role – Film
 Liam Cunningham for The Wind That Shakes the Barley (Winner)
 Pádraic Delaney for The Wind That Shakes the Barley
 Gerard McSorley for Middletown
 Stephen Rea for Breakfast on Pluto

Best Actress in a Supporting Role – Film
 Fionnula Flanagan for Transamerica (Winner)
 Sinéad Cusack for The Tiger's Tail
 Orla Fitzgerald for The Wind That Shakes the Barley
 Ruth Negga for Breakfast on Pluto

Best Actor in a Lead Role – Television
 Ciarán Hinds for Rome (Winner)
 Liam Cunningham for Showbands
 Michael McElhatton for Hide & Seek 
 James Nesbitt for Murphy's Law

Best Actress in a Lead Role – Television
 Ger Ryan for Stardust (Winner)
 Ruth Bradley for Legend 
 Anne-Marie Duff for The Virgin Queen
 Aisling O'Sullivan for The Clinic

Best Actor in a Supporting Role – Television
 Gary Lydon for The Clinic (Winner)
 Liam Cunningham for Murphy's Law
 Allen Leech for Legend
 Christopher O'Dowd for Showbands

Best Actress in a Supporting Role – Television
 Ruth Bradley for Stardust (Winner)
 Leigh Arnold for The Clinic
 Gemma Craven for The Clinic
 Tina Kellegher for Showbands

Awards in television

Best Single Drama/Drama Serial
 Stardust (Winner) Fallout
 Hide & Seek
 Legend Best Drama Series/Soap The Clinic (Winner)
 Murphy's Law
 Ros na Rún
 Showbands

Best Current Affairs/News Programme
 Prime Time Investigates: "Sex Traffic" (Winner)
 BBC Newsline Special: "Death of George Best"
 Prime Time Investigates: "A National Emergency"
 Prime Time Investigates: "Homelessness"

Best Children's/Youth
 Aifric (Winner)
 Dustin's Daily News
 Trí Shúle an Chait
 The Ugly Duckling & Me

Best Entertainment
 Naked Camera (Winner)
 Jokerman: Tommy Tiernan in America
 The Panel
 The Podge & Rodge Show

Best Factual Entertainment
 In Search of the Pope's Children (Winner)
 Des Bishop: Joy in the Hood
 Rip-Off Republic
 Wild Trials

Best Sports Feature
 Mícheál: The Sound of Sunday (Winner)
 Brian Kerr's World Cup Story
 The Dubs: Story of A Season
 Leagues Apart with Ardal O'Hanlon

Best Single Documentary
 Flann O'Brien: The Lives of Brian (Winner)
 The Brothers
 The Ghosts of Duffy's Cut
 No Go: The Free Derry Story
 Tails from America

Best Documentary Series
 The Legend of Liam Clancy (Winner)
 The Family Silver: "Bawnmore"
 Junior Doctors
 Made in America (TV series)|Made in America

Best Irish Language
 Maírtín Ó Cadhain: Rí an Fhocail (Winner)
 Aifric
 An Gealigoir Nocht
 Ros na Rún

Awards across film and television

The IFB & NIFTC Breakthrough Talent Award
 Niall Heery (writer/director) for Small Engine Repair (Winner)
 Pádraic Delaney (actor) for The Wind That Shakes the Barley
 Orla Fitzgerald (actress) for The Wind That Shakes the Barley
 Domhnall Gleeson (actor) for Studs 
 Brian Kirk (director) for Middletown
 Lucy Kennedy (TV presenter) for The Podge and Rodge Show

Best Editing in Film / TV Drama 
 Stephen O'Connell for Stardust (Winner)
 Dermot Diskinfor Showbands
 Cúán MacConghail for Studs
 Ray Roantree for Fallout

Best Sound in Film / TV Drama 
 Peter Blayney, Patrick Drummond, John Fitzgerald, Mervyn Moore for Lassie (Winner)
 Michelle Cunniffe, John Fitzgeral, Nikki Moss, Simon Willis for Middletown
 Sarah Gaines, Peter Blayney, Jon Stevenson & Dan Birch for Stardust
 Brendan Deasy for The Tiger's Tail

Best Short Film
 Joyriders (Winner)
 Bongo Bong
 The Faeries of Blackheath Woods
 The White Dress

Best Short Animation
 Horn Ok Please (Winner)
 Badly Drawn Roy
 The Faeries of Blackheath Woods
 The White Dress

People's choice awards

AIB Best Irish Film People's Choice
 The Wind That Shakes the Barley (Winner)
 Breakfast on Pluto
 Lassie
 Studs

Pantene Best International Actress People's Choice
 Helen Mirren for The Queen (Winner)
 Penélope Cruz for Volver
 Eva Green for Casino Royale
 Kate Winslet for The Holiday

Best International Actor People's Choice
 Leonardo DiCaprio for The Departed (Winner)
 Sacha Baron Cohen for Borat
 Daniel Craig for Casino Royale
 Ian McKellen for X-Men: The Last Stand

TV Personality of the Year
 Bill O'Herlihy (Winner)
 Eamonn Holmes
 Gerry Kelly
 Taragh Loughrey Grant
 Daithí O'Sé

Lifetime achievement award

 Awarded to Gay Byrne

IFTA Industry Contribution Award

 Awarded to Nuala Moiselle

References 
 
 

2007 in Irish television
4